Lev Veniaminovych Lyulyev (March 17 (OS: March 4), 1908 in Kiev, Russian Empire — November 1, 1985 in Moscow, USSR) was a Soviet designer of artillery, anti-aircraft rockets, and SA missile systems. He was the chief designer of the OKB-8 (later NPO Novator which currently bears his name) between 1946 and 1985 and the Doctor of Technical Sciences (AS USSR, 1966). He was awarded the Hero of Socialist Labour twice in 1966 and in 1985 and was the Laureate of the 1967 Lenin and 1948 and 1977 State Prizes.

Lyulyev was educated at the Kiev Polytechnic Institute (KPI) from 1927 to 1933. In 1941, he was evacuated to Sverdlovsk with the factory and appointed Vice Chief designer of the 8th Factory (known as JSC MZiK since 1994). In the years of the Second World War the factory produced about 20 thousand artillery guns and their mountings and participated in the modernisation process of the 85 mm KS-1 gun, also
organising the production of 85 mm D-5 guns and 100 mm D-10 guns for the SAUs (self-propelled artillery vehicles) SU-85 and SU-100.

On June 25, 1945, Lyulyev was promoted to Chief designer of the Factory №8. 1945-1947 he developed the 85 mm zenith gun KS-18 and the experimental 100 mm zenith gun KS-19 in 1947, which became the prototype of the next generation zenith guns before the SA guided missiles came. He also started the development of 130 mm zenith gun KS-30.

In 1947, he was also appointed a Chief designer of Sverdlovsk Machine-Building Plant №8, where he formed the Chief designer division (OGK) - later OKB-8 of the Ministry of Aviation Industry (translit. Ministerstvo Aviatsionnoy Promishlennosti, MAP) for the purpose of development of large caliber anti-aircraft artillery systems. In 1957, Lyulyec developed the most powerful KN-52 zenith gun. In 1958, OKB-8 decided to move to the development of anti-aircraft missile systems. Under his leadership those SA missiles were developed:

 3M8 (developed since 1958, in service since 1965), 3M8M, 3M8M1 (in service since 1967), 3M8M2 (in service since 1971)
 9M38, 9M38M1, 9M38M2 for the Buk missile system
 9M82 (in service since 1988) and 9M83 (in service since 1983) for the S-300V
 9M82M and 9M83M for the Antey 2500 SAM system
 Ural SA missile
 M-31 (KS-42, experimental, 1961)
 KS-168
 KS-172
 3M54 Biryuza
 V-755
 countermissile 5Ya26 (experimental, 1963) for the S-225
 countermissile 53T6 (PRS-1) for the A-135 (in service since 1995)
 countermissile 53T6M (PRS-1M, experimental, 1990th)
 countermissile 51T6 (experimental, 1980th)
 naval antisubmarine missile complex Vyuga (since 1960), complex RPK-2, naval missile 81R (in service since 1969), export variant called Vysota
 target missile Virazh and Virazh-M on the basis of 3M8 и 3M8M
 countermissile PRS-1M
 countermissile 45T6
 naval antisubmarine missile complex RPK-6 Vodopad (in service since 1981)
 naval antisubmarine missile complex RPK-7 100RU (in service since 1984), export variant called Veter
 naval missile Alpha (experimental)
 naval missile RK-55
 antisubmarine missile UR-91R
 submarine missile 3M14
 target missile Mirazh

Awards
 May 12, 1941 — Order of the Red Banner for the distinguished services in the field of the design of the new weapons for the Soviet Army (RKKA) and the Navy
 June 5, 1942 — Order of the Red Star for the design and development of the new weapon models
 August 9, 1944 — Order "Badge of Honour" for the masterly implementation of the development and production of the new weapon types
 July 9, 1945 — Order of Lenin for the successful implementation of the State Defence Committee (GKO) orders for the production of artillery weapons for the Red Army
 1948 - USSR Stalin (State) Prize 
 June 1966 - Hero of Socialist Labour for the distinguished services in the Five Years Plan of 1960–1965 and the design of the new weapon types
 1967 - Laureate of the Lenin Prize
 1977 - USSR State Prize for the design of the new weapon types
 March 1978 — Order of the Red Banner for the distinguished services and personal contribution to the field of the design of the new weapons and equipment type and in case of the 70 years anniversary
 March 1985 - Hero of Socialist Labour

External links
World-known scientists founders of scientific - pedagogical schools at National Technical University of Ukraine "Kiev Polytechnic Institute" website
https://web.archive.org/web/20071013072107/http://testpilot.ru/russia/novator/novator.htm

Soviet engineers
Soviet inventors
Heroes of Socialist Labour
1908 births
1985 deaths